Frederick Muhlenberg (1750–1801) was the first Speaker of the U.S. House of Representatives.

Frederick Muhlenberg  may also refer to:

Frederick Augustus Muhlenberg (1887–1980), architect, Army officer and U.S. congressman from Pennsylvania
Frederick Augustus Muhlenberg (educator) (1818–1901), president of Muhlenberg College

See also
 Portrait of Frederick Muhlenberg, portrait of Frederick Muhlenberg (1750–1801) by Joseph Wright